New Zealand sent a delegation to compete at the 1996 Summer Paralympics in Atlanta.

Medallist table

See also
1996 Summer Paralympics
New Zealand at the Paralympics
New Zealand at the 1996 Summer Olympics

External links
International Paralympic Committee

References 

Nations at the 1996 Summer Paralympics
1996
Summer Paralympics